The National Centre of Excellence in Geology (NCEG), University of Peshawar, is an institution of higher learning and research in geosciences. It was established in 1974 under an act of the Pakistani parliament.
The institute offers MS and Ph.D programs in Geology, Geophysics Geospatial, and Environmental Geology.
The NCEG offers vast fields of study in special relation to Geology, i.e.
Engineering Geology,
Structural Geology,
Sedimentology,
Geochemistry,
Mineralogy,
Petrography,
Quaternary Geology,
Economic Geology,
Hydrogeology,
Environmental Geology.

Center activities
According to the Centre, its primary goals include:

 To engage in goal-oriented high-level teaching and research, 
 To train research scientists,
 To conduct M.Phil., Ph.D., and other programs (Diploma) in Earth & Environmental Sciences in accordance with the standards and requirements of the University,
 To promote co-operation and inter-disciplinary relationship with other teaching/research organizations/universities and with industry,
 To arrange conferences, seminars, workshops and refresher courses for the development of teaching and research, and 
 To conduct teaching and research in such particular disciplines as is assigned to it by the Federal Government.

References

External links
http://nceg.uop.edu.pk

Geology education
Universities and colleges in Peshawar